Karen Fishwick (born 12 May 1990) is a Scottish actor and musician.

Fishwick was born in Clarkston, East Renfrewshire. She trained at Motherwell College.

She has appeared in a number of productions in Glasgow at the Citizens Theatre and other venues, starring in productions of Our Lady of Perpetual Succour and Hansel and Gretel.

Filmography

Stage productions 
 Present Laughter (2013, as Daphne)
 Lady Windermere's Fan (2013, as Lady Agatha)
 Mr Bolfry (2014, as Jean)
 The Yellow on the Broom (2014, as Bessie)
 Beauty and the Beast (2014 - 2015, as Bonnie)
 The Caucasian Chalk Circle (2015, as Young Woman/Lawyer and others)
 Mother Goose (2015 - 2016, as Ginny Goose)
 Our Ladies of Perpetual Succour (2015 - 2016, as Kay)
 Hansel and Gretel (2016, as Gretel)
 Romeo and Juliet (2018 - 2019, as Juliet)

References

External links
 

21st-century Scottish actresses
21st-century Scottish women singers
Living people
Scottish film actresses
Scottish stage actresses
Place of birth missing (living people)
Year of birth uncertain
1990 births